The 1988 WCHA Men's Ice Hockey Tournament was the 29th conference playoff in league history and 36th season where a WCHA champion was crowned. The tournament was played between February 25 and March 7, 1988. First round games were played at home team campus sites while all 'Final Four' matches were held, for the first time, at the Civic Center in St. Paul, Minnesota. This was the first year in the tournament's history that the championship game was held at a neutral site which it would continue to do henceforward (as of 2014). By winning the tournament, Wisconsin was awarded the Broadmoor Trophy and received the WCHA's automatic bid to the 1988 NCAA Division I Men's Ice Hockey Tournament.

Additionally, this was the first season that the WCHA named a tournament MVP as well as an All-Tournament Team.

Format
The first round of the postseason tournament featured a best-of-three games format. Teams were seeded No. 1 through No. 8 according to their final conference standing, with a tiebreaker system used to seed teams with an identical number of points accumulated. The top four seeded teams each earned home ice and hosted one of the lower seeded teams.

The winners of the first round series advanced to the semifinal and championship rounds held at the Civic Center. All Final Four games used a single-elimination format. Teams were re-seeded No. 1 through No. 4 according to the final regular season conference standings, with the top remaining seed matched against lowest remaining seed in one semifinal game while the two other semifinalists meeting with the winners advancing to the championship game and the losers competing in a Third Place contest. The Tournament Champion received an automatic bid to the 1988 NCAA Division I Men's Ice Hockey Tournament.

Conference standings
Note: GP = Games played; W = Wins; L = Losses; T = Ties; PTS = Points; GF = Goals For; GA = Goals Against

Bracket
Teams are reseeded after the first round

Note: * denotes overtime period(s)

First round

(1) Minnesota vs. (8) Colorado College

(2) Wisconsin vs. (7) Northern Michigan

(3) Denver vs. (6) Minnesota-Duluth

(4) Michigan Tech vs. (5) North Dakota

Semifinals

(1) Minnesota vs. (6) Minnesota-Duluth

(2) Wisconsin vs. (5) North Dakota

Third Place

(5) North Dakota vs. (6) Minnesota-Duluth

Championship

(1) Minnesota vs. (2) Wisconsin

Tournament awards

All-Tournament Team
F Neil Eisenhut (North Dakota)
F Paul Ranheim (Wisconsin)
F Steve Tuttle (Wisconsin)
D Randy Skarda (Minnesota)
D Paul Stanton (Wisconsin)
G Dean Anderson* (Wisconsin)
* Most Valuable Player(s)

See also
Western Collegiate Hockey Association men's champions

References

External links
WCHA.com
1987–88 WCHA Standings
1987–88 NCAA Standings
2013–14 Colorado College Tigers Media Guide
2013–14 Denver Pioneers Media Guide
2013–14 Minnesota Golden Gophers Media Guide 
2012–13 Minnesota-Duluth Bulldogs Media Guide
2013–14 North Dakota Hockey Media Guide
2006–07 Northern Michigan Wildcats Media Guide
2003–04 Wisconsin Badgers Media Guide

WCHA Men's Ice Hockey Tournament
Wcha Men's Ice Hockey Tournament
WCHA Men's Ice